Melchior Hoffmann may refer to:

 Melchior Hoffman (c. 1495–1543), Anabaptist prophet 
 Melchior Hoffmann (composer) (1679–1715), Baroque composer